Mohammed Hassan Milhim (4 September 1929 – 17 July 2021) was a Palestinian politician, who served as mayor of Halhul. He graduated from the Lebanese University with a certificate in English literature in 1974. He was elected mayor of Halhul in 1976. In 1980 he was exiled from the West Bank for being a member of the PLO Executive Committee and was allowed back 12 years later. He served as Yasser Arafat's consultant and several roles in the Palestinian Ministry of Education.

References

External links
Curriculum vitae of the Mayor

1929 births
2021 deaths
Mayors of places in the State of Palestine
Palestine Liberation Organization members
People from Halhul
Lebanese University alumni